In Greek mythology, Lycus or Lykos was a ruler of the ancient city of Ancient Thebes (Boeotia). His rule was preceded by the regency of Nycteus and in turn, Lycus was succeeded by the twins Amphion and Zethus.

Family

Lycus and his brother Nycteus were the sons of either (1) Chthonius, one of the Spartoi; or (2) of the nymph Clonia and Hyrieus, the son of Poseidon and the Atlantid Alkyone; or lastly (3) of Poseidon and the Pleiad Celaeno. He was married to Dirce and possibly by her, the father of another Lycus. Lycus was the uncle of Antiope, daughter of Nycteus.

Mythology
Lycus and Nycteus fled from Euboea after they murdered King Phlegyas, settling in Hyria and then moving to Thebes, because they were friends with Pentheus, its king.

Pentheus's successor was Polydorus, who married Nycteis, the daughter of Nycteus.  Nycteus served as regent for Labdacus, the son of Polydorus, when Polydorus died at a young age.  Nycteus's daughter, Antiope, was impregnated by Zeus, and fled to Sicyon to marry King Epopeus.

Pausanias writes that Nycteus waged war on Epopeus, but in battle was wounded, and died after being carried back to Thebes, appointing Lycus as regent for Labdacus.  Nycteus urged Lycus to continue to attack Epopeus, and to retake and punish Antiope.  Epopeus died of a wound just as Nycteus did, and his heir Lamedon gave Antiope up freely to avoid war.

The author of the Bibliotheca, however, writes that  Lycus was the one chosen regent after the deaths of Pentheus and Labdacus.  Nycteus killed himself from shame when he discovered Antiope's pregnancy, and Lycus initiated the attack because he himself desired to punish her, successfully carrying her off after the battle.

In either case, Antiope gave birth to the twins Amphion and Zethus on the way back to Thebes, at Mount Cithaeron.  Lycus abandoned the babies, leaving them with shepherds.

Once he returned to Thebes, Lycus gained custody of his niece Antiope. She was given over by Lycus to Dirce who took her away, locked her up and tortured her cruelly. After many years, Antiope escaped and found her sons who vowed to reap revenge for what Lycus and Dirce did to their mother for all those years. Eventually, they returned to Thebes to kill Lycus and Dirce and take command of the city. According to Euripides, Hermes forbade the twins from killing Lycus, although he forced Lycus to give them Thebes.

Theban royal family tree

Notes

References 

 Apollodorus, The Library with an English Translation by Sir James George Frazer, F.B.A., F.R.S. in 2 Volumes, Cambridge, MA, Harvard University Press; London, William Heinemann Ltd. 1921. ISBN 0-674-99135-4. Online version at the Perseus Digital Library. Greek text available from the same website.
 Gantz, Timothy, Early Greek Myth: A Guide to Literary and Artistic Sources, Johns Hopkins University Press, 1996, Two volumes:  (Vol. 1),  (Vol. 2).
 Pausanias, Description of Greece with an English Translation by W.H.S. Jones, Litt.D., and H.A. Ormerod, M.A., in 4 Volumes. Cambridge, MA, Harvard University Press; London, William Heinemann Ltd. 1918. . Online version at the Perseus Digital Library
 Pausanias, Graeciae Descriptio. 3 vols. Leipzig, Teubner. 1903.  Greek text available at the Perseus Digital Library.
 Tripp, Edward, Crowell's Handbook of Classical Mythology, Thomas Y. Crowell Co; First edition (June 1970). .

Theban kings
Kings in Greek mythology
Children of Poseidon
Demigods in classical mythology
Theban characters in Greek mythology